Jackie Junction is a remote location in Western Australia on the Gunbarrel Highway. It was named by the road builder Len Beadell after his youngest daughter and is at the junction of the original Gunbarrel Highway and the road to Warburton.

History
In May 1958 during survey work to determine the course of the Gunbarrel Highway, Beadell travelled through virgin scrub from Giles to Warburton, an existing Aboriginal mission station. Survey westward from Jackie Junction took place from 14–28 May 1958, a road from Jackie Junction to Warburton was built in late August 1958, and construction of the final section of Gunbarrel Highway began on 3 September 1958 towards Carnegie Station. The road was completed on 15 November 1958.

Gallery

References

Roads built by Len Beadell